The 2002–03 season was the club's 44th season in the Turkish Super League and the club's 100th year in existence. After signing Romanian manager Mircea Lucescu, Beşiktaş won the league for the 12th time in club' history. Beşiktaş also had their most successful UEFA Cup run, by becoming a quarter finalist, however the club lost to S.S. Lazio 1–3 on aggregate, therefore eliminating them. Beşiktaş lost to Gençlerbirliği 3–4 in the quarterfinals of the Turkish Cup.

Squad
Source:

Competitions

Süper Lig

League table

Turkish Cup

Beşiktaş had a bye in the first round and then played Elazığspor in the second round. Beşiktaş lost to Gençlerbirliği in the quarter finals.

UEFA Cup
Beşiktaş had their most successful run, by becoming a quarter finalist. In doing so, they became the second Turkish team to achieve the feat (Galatasaray achieved it in 2000).

First round

Beşiktaş won 7–2 on aggregate.

Second round

Beşiktaş won 2–1 on aggregate.

Third round

Beşiktaş won 3–1 on aggregate.

Fourth round

Beşiktaş won 4–3 on aggregate.

Quarter-final

Beşiktaş lost 1–3 on aggregate.

References

External links
 2002–03 Süper Lig Standings at Turkish Football Federation

Beşiktaş J.K. seasons
Besiktas
Turkish football championship-winning seasons